Hamilton Townsend  (1843-1895) was an Anglican priest in Ireland in the second half of the nineteenth century

Allen was born in County Down, educated at Trinity College, Dublin  and ordained in 1850. He was Rector of Killoran from 1862; Archdeacon of Achonry from 1862 to 1883; and  a Canon of  St Patrick's Cathedral, Dublin from 1875. He was Dean of Achonry from 1883  until his death.

References

1895 deaths
1843 births
Alumni of Trinity College Dublin
Archdeacons of Achonry
19th-century Irish Anglican priests
People from County Down
Deans of Achonry